Joseph Hamood (September 7, 1943 — August 19, 1970) was an American professional basketball player. After playing college basketball at the University of Houston, the  guard played for one season in the American Basketball Association with the Houston Mavericks.

Hamood was killed in an automobile accident at age 26 in Dearborn, Michigan.

References

External links
Career ABA stats @ basketball-reference.com

1943 births
1970 deaths
American men's basketball players
Basketball players from Michigan
Fordson High School alumni
Houston Cougars men's basketball players
Houston Mavericks players
Point guards
Road incident deaths in Michigan